Victor Amadeus I (8 May 1587 – 7 October 1637) was the Duke of Savoy from 1630 to 1637. He was also known as the Lion of Susa.

Biography

He was born in Turin, Piedmont to Charles Emmanuel I, Duke of Savoy and Catherine Micaela of Spain, daughter of King Philip II of Spain. He spent much of his childhood in Madrid at the court of his grandfather Philip II. He stayed there until the king's death in 1598, when Victor Amadeus was eleven. When his brother, Filippo Emanuele, died in 1605, he became heir-apparent to the Duchy of Savoy and received the homage of the court at Racconigi on 21 January 1607.

Victor Amadeus became Duke of Savoy after his father's death in 1630. Charles Emmanuel's policies had brought a great instability in the relationships with both France and Spain, and troops were needed to defend the Duchy. As money was lacking to recruit mercenaries or train indigenous soldiers, Victor Amadeus signed a peace treaty with Spain.

With the Treaty of Cherasco, Savoy was forced to give Pinerolo to France.  This gave France a strategic route into the heart of Savoy territory and on into the rest of Italy.  The rulers of Savoy from that point resented this loss, and worked for decades with the goal of regaining that loss.  Subsequently, under the direction of Cardinal Richelieu, Victor Amadeus attempted to create an anti-Spanish league in Italy. He achieved two victories against the Spanish: In 1636 in the Battle of Tornavento and on 8 September 1637 in the Battle of Mombaldone.

Death
On 25 September 1637, Victor Amadeus fell ill after a dinner offered by the Duke of Créqui. A prominent Savoyard noble (Count Augusto Manfredo Scaglia di Verrua) who attended the dinner also died in the same week, arousing suspicions of poisoning and generating uncertainty in Savoyard-French relations. The duke was carried to Vercelli, where he died on 7 October, aged 50.

Marriage and issue
In 1619, he married Christine Marie of France (1606–1663), a daughter of Henry IV of France and Marie de' Medici. Following his death, she served as regent of the Duchy from 1637 to 1663.  They had children including:

Stillborn son (1621)
Prince Louis Amadeus of Savoy (Turin, 1622 – Turin, 1628)
Prince Francis Hyacinth of Savoy (Turin, 14 September 1632 – Castello del Valentino, 4 October 1638), Duke of Savoy
Princess Luisa Cristina of Savoy (Turin, 27 July 1629 – Turin, 14 May 1692), married her uncle Prince Maurice of Savoy
Prince Charles Emmanuel of Savoy (20 June 1634 – Palace of Venaria, 12 June 1675), Duke of Savoy; married first his first cousin Françoise Madeleine d'Orléans and had no issue; secondly married another first cousin Marie Jeanne of Savoy and had issue;
Princess Margaret Yolande of Savoy (Turin, 15 November 1635 – Parma, 29 April 1663), married Ranuccio II Farnese, Duke of Parma; had two stillborn children; died giving birth to her last child;
Princess Henrietta Adelaide Marie of Savoy (Turin, 6 November 1636 – Munich, 18 March  1676), married Ferdinand Maria of Wittelsbach, Elector of Bavaria and had issue
Princess Catherine Beatrice of Savoy (Turin, 6 November 1636 – Turin, 26 August 1637) twin of the above

Ancestry

Notes

References

External links
 

1587 births
1637 deaths
17th-century Dukes of Savoy
Nobility from Turin
Princes of Piedmont
Claimant Kings of Jerusalem
Princes of Savoy
Burials at Vercelli Cathedral
17th-century Italian nobility
Italian people of the Thirty Years' War